The 1879 Melbourne Cup was a two-mile handicap horse race which took place on Tuesday, 4 November 1879.

This year was the nineteenth running of the Melbourne Cup.

This is the list of placegetters for the 1879 Melbourne Cup.

See also

 Melbourne Cup
 List of Melbourne Cup winners
 Victoria Racing Club

References

External links
1879 Melbourne Cup footyjumpers.com

1879
Melbourne Cup
Melbourne Cup
19th century in Melbourne
1870s in Melbourne